The Vărbilău is a right tributary of the river Teleajen in Romania. It discharges into the Teleajen in Dumbrăvești. It flows through the villages Târșoreni, Scurtești, Ștefești, Aluniș, Livadea, Vărbilău, Poiana Vărbilău, Coțofenești and Dumbrăvești.

Tributaries

The following rivers are tributaries to the river Vărbilău:

Left: Vărsăturile, Valea Albă, Valea Seacă, Valea Pietrei, Valea Brădetului, Vulpea, Valea Poienii, Slănic
Right: Valea Secărei, Aluniș

References

Rivers of Romania
Rivers of Prahova County